This article lists state forests in the Commonwealth of Puerto Rico.

Puerto Rico state forests

The following are Puerto Rico state forests. 

Key:
B = Boating
C = Camping
F = Fishing
G = Photography
H = Hiking
K = Kayaking
O = Nature Observation
P = Picnicking
R = Scientific Research
S = Swimming
W = Bird Watching

Other Puerto Rico government forests
The following forest is owned by the Puerto Rico but managed by the Taller de Arte y Cultura community-based group at Casa Pueblo. 

Key:
C = Camping
G = Photography
H = Hiking
O = Nature Observation
P = Picnicking
S = Swimming
W = Bird Watching

See also

El Yunque National Forest
List of National Natural Landmarks in Puerto Rico
List of U.S. National Forests
Protected areas of Puerto Rico

Notes

References

External links
Puerto Rico Department of Natural and Environmental Resources (Spanish)
El Estado de los Bosques de Puerto Rico, 2003. Archived.

Puerto Rico
Forests
Forests